Schlüchtern station is a station for trains. It is in the town of Schlüchtern in the German state of Hesse on the Kinzig Valley Railway. The station is classified by Deutsche Bahn (DB) as a category 4 station.

History
The station was opened on 15 December 1868 along with the Neuhof–Steinau (Straße) section of the Kinzig Valley Railway, and the Kinzig Valley Railway was built as part of the Frankfurt–Bebra railway, which was established by the Landgraviate of Hesse-Kassel, the Grand Duchy of Hesse and Free City of Frankfurt, but was confiscated by the Prussian government following the War of 1866.

Station facilities

Platforms
The train station has 4 platform tracks, a "home" platform (that is next to the station building), an island platform and a side platform. The home platform (platform 1) is only used by Regionalbahn services running on the Schlüchtern–Jossa–Gemünden–Würzburg route, which begin and end here. The central platform (tracks 2 and 4) is used by Regional-Express services on the Frankfurt–Fulda route. The side platform (platform 5) is rarely used. About 3 km east of the station is the beginning of the Schlüchtern tunnel through the Distelrasen ridge.

Entrance building
The stately entrance building of 1868 is now listed as a monument under the Hessian Heritage Act. It is built in various styles on the hillside above the town on the south side of the tracks. The two storey brick building has an H-shaped floor plan with a completely symmetrical facade. The freight shed is uphill to the west. The canopies over the pedestrian underpass were built in 1910 of steel and glass in the Art Nouveau style.

Operations
Fares in Schlüchtern are set by the Rhein-Main-Verkehrsverbund (Rhine-Main Transport Association, RMV). The station is served by a Regionalbahn service every two hours and a Regional-Express service every hour. It is served by a single Intercity service on the Bebra–Fulda–Frankfurt route from Mondays to Fridays, which stops at the station
at 5:56. On Mondays the service starts from Berlin-Gesundbrunnen. It stops in the opposite direction at 19:09.

References

Footnotes

Sources

External links 
 

Railway stations in Hesse
Art Nouveau architecture in Germany
Railway stations in Germany opened in 1868
Art Nouveau railway stations
Buildings and structures completed in 1910
Buildings and structures in Main-Kinzig-Kreis